The Berowra Creek, a watercourse that is part of the Hawkesbury-Nepean catchment, is located to the north of the Sydney central business district in the Hornsby Shire of New South Wales, Australia.

Course and features
The river descends  over its  course.

 The creek is characterised by a drowned river valley estuary, consisting of steeply incised gorges with surrounding plateau areas. It is fed by a number of small tributaries that drain the steep catchments adjacent to the waterway.

The area around the creek is most developed near its source in the south, influenced by the development of Hornsby and its surrounding suburbs. As the creek flows to the north, it flows through a catchment area that is mostly bushland and includes parts of the Marramarra National Park, the Muogamarra Nature Reserve, and the Berowra Valley Regional Park. The steep sides of the creek have limited development directly adjacent to the Berowra Creek estuary, most of which is only accessible by boat. However the small settlements of Berowra Waters and Berowra Creek are both located on its banks. The creek is a popular destination for boating, fishing and other outdoor recreational activities.
 
There are only two crossings of Berowra Creek. Galston Road crosses the upper reaches via a bridge in the Galston Gorge, between Galston and Hornsby Heights. Further downstream, the Berowra Waters Ferry, a toll-free car ferry, crosses between Berowra Waters and Berowra Heights.

The name, Berowra, is believed to be an Aboriginal word meaning "place of many winds".

See also 

 List of rivers of Australia
 List of rivers of New South Wales (A–K)
 Rivers of New South Wales

References

External links
 
  [CC-By-SA]

Creeks and canals of Sydney
Hawkesbury River